This is a list of universities in Tajikistan.

 Agricultural University of Tajikistan
 American University of Istaravshan
 Khorugh State University named after M. Nazarshoyev
 Khujand State University named after academician Bobojon Ghafurov
 Kulob State University
 Liberty University of Tajikistan
 Lomonosov Moscow State University branch
 Pädagogische Universität Tadschikistan
 Qurghonteppa State University, named after Nasir Khusraw
 Russian-Tajik Slavonic University
 Tajik Energy Institute
 Tajik State Medical University, named after Avicenna
 Tajik State National University
 Tajik State Pedagogical University, named after Jurayev
 Tajik State University of Commerce
 Tajik Technical University, named after Muhammad Osimi
 Tajik University of Law, Business and Politics
 Tajikistan Humanitarian International University
 Tajikistan-Russian Modern University
 Tajikistan State University of Law, Business, & Politics
 Technological University of Tajikistan
 University of Central Asia, Khorog, GBAO
 University of Khajuraho

References

External links

Universities
Tajikistan
Tajikistan